Princess Zahra Aga Khan (born 18 September 1970 in Geneva, Switzerland) is the eldest child of Aga Khan IV and his first wife, Princess Salimah Aga Khan.

Education 
Princess Zahra attended Le Rosey School in Switzerland and received her undergraduate degree cum laude in Development Studies from Harvard University (AB’94). She also completed a four-month program at Massachusetts General Hospital to enhance her understanding of healthcare systems and the delivery of advanced medical care, and an Executive Finance course at IMD in Lausanne.

Career 
Princess Zahra Aga Khan is a Member of the Board of Directors of the Aga Khan Development Network (AKDN) and also sits on the board of several of its affiliated structures, including the Aga Khan Foundation, the Aga Khan Trust for Culture, the Aga Khan Agency for Habitat, the Aga Khan Agency for Microfinance and the Aga Khan Schools. She also serves as a Trustee of the Aga Khan University.

She has policy and management responsibility for the Health, Education, and Planning and Building Services Companies of the AKDN and their institutions, working in more than a dozen countries in the Developing World. She is also involved at the strategic level with other agencies of the AKDN, working in the areas of social and economic development.

Princess Zahra is a board member of the Global Centre for Pluralism, sits in the France Galop Committee and serves as the President of the Consiglio Direttivo of Yacht Club Costa Smeralda.

Personal life
She married British businessman and former model Mark Boyden, an Anglican, in a civil ceremony on 21 June 1997. The wedding was held at the Chateau de Chantilly near Paris, in the presence of guests including King Juan Carlos and Queen Sofía of Spain, and Prince Hassan bin Talal of Jordan. The couple divorced in 2005.

Princess Zahra and Mark Boyden have a daughter, Sara, and a son, Iliyan.

Like her father, Princess Zahra is a fan of thoroughbred horse racing and has begun racing horses in her own name, the owner-breeder of the Prix Vermeille winner Mandesha.

On October 10, 2019, the Roy M. Huffington Award was presented to Princess Zahra by the Asia Society Texas Center. The Award recognizes leaders who have been a major force on the international stage.

References

1970 births
Living people
Noorani family
Alumni of Institut Le Rosey
Harvard University alumni
French racehorse owners and breeders
French Ismailis
People from Geneva
Swiss people of Iranian descent
Swiss people of Pakistani descent
Swiss people of English descent